The dwarf wrasse, Doratonotus megalepis, is a species of wrasse native to tropical waters of the western Atlantic Ocean from Florida, United States, to Brazil and in the eastern Atlantic from around Ile Las Rolas, São Tomé and the Cape Verde Islands. It can be found in the aquarium trade. This species is the only known member of its genus.

References

Labridae
Fish described in 1862
Taxa named by Albert Günther